The 1880–81 season was Morton Football Club's fourth season in which they competed at a national level, entering the Scottish Cup.

Fixtures and results

Scottish Cup

Renfrewshire Cup

Friendlies

1. Scratch Morton team.
2. One goal from each team was recorded as "disputed".
3. Pollok failed to appear.

References

External links
Greenock Morton FC official site

Greenock Morton F.C. seasons
Morton